The Brahma Kumaris are a spiritual movement that originated in Hyderabad, Sindh, during the 1930s.
The Brahma Kumaris ("Daughters of Brahma") movement was founded by Lekhraj Kripalani. The organisation is known for the prominent role that women play in the movement.

It teaches a type of meditation that emphasizes identity as souls rather than bodies. They think that all souls are good by nature and that God is the source of all goodness. The organisation teaches to transcend labels associated with the body, such as race, nationality, religion, and gender, and it aspires to establish a global culture based on what it calls "soul-consciousness".

In 2008, the movement claimed to have more than 825,000 regular students, with over 8500 centres in 100 countries.

Early history 

The Brahma Kumaris, originally called Om Mandali, started in Hyderabad, Sindh in north-west India (present-day Pakistan) It received this name because members would chant "Om" together, before having discourse on spiritual matters in the traditional satsang style. The original discourses were closely connected to the Bhagavad Gita.

The founder, Lekhraj Khubchand Kirpilani (who became known in the group as "Om Baba") was a wealthy jeweler. He reported what he said were a series of visions and other transcendental experiences that commenced around 1935 and became the basis for the discourses. He said he believed there was a greater power working through him and that many of those who attended these gatherings were themselves having spiritual experiences. The majority of those who came were women and children from the Bhaibund caste - a caste of wealthy merchants and business people whose husbands and fathers were often overseas on business.

After about three years of meetings it became clear that Om Mandali was giving very special importance to the role of women, and was not adhering to the caste system. The group had named a 22-year-old woman, Radhe Pokardas Rajwani (then known as "Om Radhe") as its president, and her management committee was made up of eight other women. People from any caste were allowed to attend meetings. The group also advocated that young women had the right to elect not to marry and that married women had the right to choose a celibate life. In tradition-bound patriarchal India, these personal life decisions were the exclusive right of men. A committee headed by a number of important male members of the Bhaibund community began to form in opposition and became known as the 'Anti-Om Mandali Committee'. On 21 June 1938 this group picketed Om Mandali's premises preventing members from entering. This caused considerable upheaval in the community.  Women attending were verbally abused, there was an attempt to burn the premises down and the police made several arrests. Many women and girls were later victims of domestic violence in their homes. The picketing resulted in criminal proceedings being taken against both groups, and on 16 August 1938 the local District Magistrate ordered that Om Mandali be prevented from meeting. This ban was reversed on 21 November 1938 after an appeal to the Court of the Judicial Commissioner of Sindh. In an unusual move the judges directly criticised the District Magistrate for trying to punish the victims for the disturbance caused by the perpetrators and for trying to apply the law according to his own personal bias. Nevertheless, in an increasingly sour atmosphere, Om Mandali had decided to leave Hyderabad and gradually relocated its activities to Karachi in the latter half of 1938. Approximately 300 members moved.

On 31 March 1939 the government appointed a tribunal to inquire into the activities of Om Mandali. When the Tribunal made its findings, Om Radhe responded by compiling a book titled Is this Justice? criticising the tribunal, which did not have a constitutional basis and made its findings without taking evidence from Om Mandali. In May 1939 the government used the tribunal's findings to effectively reinstate the ban, declaring Om Mandali an "unlawful association" under section 16 of the Criminal Law Amendment Act 1908. Nevertheless, Om Mandali continued to hold their Satsangs, and the government did not enforce it. Possibly because of this the committee then hired someone to kill Om Baba, but the attempt was unsuccessful.

Expansion

In May 1950 Om Mandali moved to Mount Abu in Rajasthan India. From the beginning, the organization's focus had been on education, not worship, and for this reason it renamed itself as Brahma Kumaris World Spiritual University.
In 1952, after a 14-year period of retreat, a more structured form of teaching began to be offered to the public by way of a seven lesson course.

After an unpromising beginning when it almost ran out of funds, from the mid-1950s the Brahma Kumaris began an international expansion programme. Since the 1970s it first spread to London and then to the West. The most visible manifestations of the religion are its "Spiritual Museums" located in most major Indian cities.

In 1980 the Brahma Kumaris became registered as a Non-Governmental Organisation with the United Nations Department of Public Relations. In 1983 the Brahma Kumaris achieved consultative status with the Economic and Social Council at the United Nations.

The leadership and membership of the BK movement remains primarily female, for example, in the UK only one-third of the 42 centres are run by males and 80% of the membership are women. , centres are mostly in followers' own homes with a tendency toward middle or upper class membership. Estimates for its worldwide membership ranges from 35,000 in 1993 to 400,000 in 1998 to 450,000 in 2000, however, it is reported that many were probably not completely committed to the group's worldview.

Beliefs 
The movement has distinguished itself from its Hindu roots and sees itself as a vehicle for spiritual teaching rather than as a religion.

Self

The Brahma Kumaris see humans as being made up of two parts; an external or visible body (including extensions such as status and possessions) and a subtle energy of the soul whose character structure is revealed through a person's external activity – but always this is created by the inner soul -whether actions are done with love, peacefully, with happiness or humility is an aspect of one's soul. The group teaches that the soul is an infinitesimal point of spiritual light residing in the forehead of the body it occupies, and that all souls originally existed with God in a "Soul World", a world of infinite light, peace and silence.

The Brahma Kumaris teach that souls enter bodies to take birth in order to experience life and give expression to their personality. Unlike other Eastern traditions, the Brahma Kumaris do not believe that the human soul can transmigrate into other species.

Supreme Soul

The Brahma Kumaris use the term "Supreme Soul" to refer to God. They see God as incorporeal and eternal, and regard him as a point of living light like human souls, but without a physical body, as he does not enter the cycle of birth, death and rebirth. God is seen as the perfect and constant embodiment of all virtues, powers and values and that He is the unconditionally loving Father of all souls, irrespective of their religion, gender, or culture.

The Brahma Kumaris believe God's purpose is to be the spiritual re-awakening of humanity and the removal of all sorrow, evil and negativity. They do not regard God as the creator of matter, as they consider matter to be eternal.

Pratibha Patil, the UPA-Left candidate and former President of India said on camera during the 2007 Indian presidential election, that she spoke to "Baba" (a term the BKs use for God) at the Brahma Kumaris World Spiritual University at their headquarters in Mount Abu, Rajasthan. Patil stated that when she met Baba He had indicated great responsibility was coming her way.

Karma

The Brahma Kumaris believe that every action performed by a soul will create a return accordingly, and that the destiny of the soul's next body depends on how it acts and behaves in this life. Through meditation, by transforming thinking patterns and eventually actions, the Brahma Kumaris believe that people can purify their "karmic account" and lead a better life in the present and next birth.

Cycle of time

In contrast to linear theories of human history that hypothesize an ancient point of origin for the universe and a final destruction, the BKs do not posit a start, end or age for the universe, believing such concepts to be an erroneous application of the human life cycle to the universe. BKs believe the universe to follow an eternal, naturally occurring 5,000-year cycle, composed of four ages (yugas): the Golden Age (Satya Yuga), the Silver Age (Treta Yuga), the Copper Age (Dvapara Yuga), the Iron Age (Kali Yuga) and each represents 1250 years of the cycle.  They also believe that at the end of the Iron Age there will be "Destruction."  They believe Destruction will kill everyone on Earth and cleanse the Earth.  Then only can the cycle repeat again.  They believe Destruction will happen when U.S.A. goes to nuclear war to Russia. The present period of this cycle is sometimes described as a fifth age or "Confluence age" as it is considered to be the confluence (the junction or meeting) between the Iron Age and the Golden age.

The first half of the cycle (the Golden and Silver ages) is considered to be the age of "soul conscious living". The Brahma Kumaris see this as a time of "heaven on earth" or as a version of the Garden of Eden when human beings are fully virtuous, complete, self-realised beings who lived in complete harmony with the natural environment. The primary enlightenment was the innate understanding of the self as a soul.

The Brahma Kumaris believe that modern civilization will be destroyed by global nuclear conflict, coupled with natural calamities and that these cataclysmic events form part of a natural and cathartic cyclic process.

When the organisation began, emphasis was placed on the physical destruction of the world as seen in the cataclysmic visions of Dada Lekhraj. As the organisation developed, it witnessed World War II, the atomic bombings of Hiroshima and Nagasaki and the Cold War, and the destructive aspects of its teachings were reframed as a process of transformation. The students of the organization had also made many failed predictions of the violent destruction of the world, between 1987 and 2008 and the original teachings also referred to a particular date 1976, aspects which are now downplayed.

Practices

Meditation

The Brahma Kumaris teaches a form of meditation through which students are encouraged to purify their minds. This may be done by sitting tranquilly, then making affirmations regarding the eternal nature of the soul, the original purity of one's nature, and the nature of God. The aim of the BK meditation is also to learn to hold meditative states while being engaged in everyday life.
 For this reason meditation is usually taught and practiced with open eyes.

Good wishes and pure feelings

Flowing on from the BK belief that everyone is a spiritual being, is the practice of Shubbhawna (pure feelings) and Shubkamna (good wishes). For BKs, all prejudices and ill-feelings are seen as arising from identifying the self and others based on external labels like race, religion, gender, nationality, beauty (or lack of), etc. However, when there is the practice of finding the intrinsic goodness in each one, the prejudice based on those labels is replaced by the vision of one Spiritual Parent, one Human family, and universal spiritual values such as respect, love, peace and happiness. A flagship slogan for the BKs has been When we change, the world changes. It is for this reason that BKs consider bringing about this kind of change within the self as an important form of "world service".

Study

The Hindi word  literally translates to "flute". It is an oral study, read to the class early each morning in most BK centres on the world. The  are derived from mediumship and spirit possession.

There are two types of : 
 Sakar Murlis refer to the original orations that BKs believe to be the Supreme Soul speaking through Brahma Baba.  
 Avyakt Murlis are spoken by BapDada. BKs believe BapDada is God and the soul of their deceased founder. BapDada(God) is believed to speak to the BKs through a senior BK medium, Dadi Gulzar.

Avyakt s are still being spoken at the BKs headquarters in India. Students must complete the Brahma Kumaris foundation course and start by attending morning  class before visiting the headquarters.

Lifestyle

Brahma Kumaris recommend a specific lifestyle in order achieve greater control over physical senses. However, many participate in a casual way, electing to adopt whichever beliefs and lifestyle disciplines in the following list they wish:

 Complete celibacy, whether in or out of marriage
 Sattvic vegetarianism, a strict lacto-vegetarian diet (excluding eggs, onions, garlic and/or spicy food) cooked only by the self or other members of the Brahma Kumaris.
 Abstaining from alcohol, tobacco and non-prescription drugs.
 Daily early morning meditation at 4:00 to 4:45 am, called 'Amrit Vela'.
 Daily morning class at approximately 6:30 am.
 Brahma Kumaris can be identified by their frequent adoption of wearing white clothes, to symbolise purity.
 Students often prefer to keep the company of other BK followers as opposed to non-BKs.

Activities

Education

Traditionally, the Brahma Kumaris conducted an introduction to meditation  consisting of seven two-hour-long sessions. The sessions include their open-eyed meditation technique and their philosophy. The organisation also offers courses in "positive thinking", "self management leadership" and "living values". They also have a number of voluntary outreach programs in prisons.

With the support of Vicente Fox, the Brahma Kumaris introduced their meditation practice and philosophy to the government of Mexico through the "Self Management Leadership" (SML). The SML course is closely related to the Brahma Kumaris philosophy and is the backbone of Brahma Kumaris management philosophy. 90 trained facilitators ran programs through which 25,000 people at the top level of government have passed.

Renewable energy

The Brahma Kumaris have launched several environment initiatives. Their work in solar energy and sustainable energy has included the 2007 development of the world's largest solar cooker, and a solar thermal power plant in Talheti at the base of Mount Abu, where the international headquarters is located. The 25-acre site is projected to produce 22000 kwh of electricity daily. The project was made financially possible with the support of the Indian and German governments.

Sustainable Yogic Agriculture
Sustainable Yogic Agriculture (SYA) is a program started in Northern India in 2009. The program has been a collaboration between Sardarkrushinagar Dantiwada Agricultural University in Gujarat India and the Brahma Kumaris Rural Development wing. The program has now been publicly backed by the Indian Government. A key member of Narendra Modi's Cabinet, Agriculture Minister Radha Mohan Singh announced the governments support for the program. With the governments support the program has been redesigned into Akhil Bharatiya Krushak Sashakatikaran Abhijan (ABKSA), and was launched in December 2015. ABKSA extends the initial scope of the SYA program to include teaching meditation and self empowerment to the farmers themselves. This is possibly a response to the problem of farmer suicides in India. ABKSA now comprises three main elements:
1. A self empowerment program for Indian farmers;
2. Ongoing research on whether the use of meditation can improve crop yields;
3. Education on a blend of traditional and organic farming techniques.
One basic premise of the Brahma Kumaris environmental initiative is that thoughts and consciousness can affect the natural environment. 

In 2012, experiments were being conducted in partnership with leading agricultural universities in India to establish if the practice of Brahma Kumaris meditation in conjunction with implementing more traditional organic farming methods could be shown to have a measurable and positive effect on crop development. An article published in the Journal of Asian Agri-History reviews two separate studies on SYA. One study was conducted by G.B. Pant University of Agriculture and Technology (GBPUAT), Pantnagar, Uttarakhand and the other by Sardarkrushinagar Dantiwada Agricultural University (SDUAT) of Gujarat. The review reports that the Brahma Kumaris meditation techniques used enhanced seed growth, seed germination rates and increased the level of microbes present in the soil.

Healthcare
In 1991, the Brahma Kumaris, Ashok Mehta, and the brothers Gulab and Khubchand Watumull opened the J Watumull Global Hospital in the Sirohi district of Rajasthan, offering medical facilities to the local population.

UN consultative status
In 1998 the Brahma Kumaris gained consultative status with the United Nations Department of Economic and Social Affairs.

Criticism
Adherents have been criticised by nonmembers for hiding or downplaying their prophesied physical destruction of the world particularly as they still believe that such an event will happen "soon".  However, they maintain that their primary purpose is to teach meditation and peace of mind, not to push their views about the different challenges the world is facing on non-members who may be visiting the group to learn about meditation or values based living.

In the Journal for the Scientific Study of Religion, Howell reported that the Brahma Kumaris protected itself from the practice of families "dumping" their daughters with the organisation by requiring a payment from the families of those wishing to dedicate their daughters to the work and services of the organisation. The payment is intended to cover the living expenses incurred during the trial period.

John Wallis wrote a book examining the status of tradition in the contemporary world, which used the religion as a case study, focusing on recruitment methods, the issue of celibacy, and reinterpretation of religious history. He reported the rewriting of the revelatory messages (Murlis) by the Brahma Kumari. They have been accused of breaking up marriages.

When the organisation started, empowering women to assert their right to remain celibate, particularly in marriage, was a prime factor in the controversy that arose in 1930s Sindh, as it directly challenged the dominance of men over women in the patriarchal Indian subcontinent. Feminist commentator Prem Chowdry has criticised the practice of celibacy within the organisation as being a form of patriarchal control.

See also
Associated concepts
 Meditation
 Mediumship
 Millenarianism
 Adhyatmik Ishwariya Vishwa Vidyalaya

General
 Hindu reform movements
 New religious movement

References
Citations

Bibliography

Further reading

External links
  
 Official Website - India 
 

 
Hindu new religious movements
Hindu organizations
Hindu organisations based in India
Hindu religious orders
Shaiva sects
Nirguna worship traditions
Organisations based in Rajasthan
Religious organizations established in 1936
Religions that require vegetarianism
1936 establishments in India
Apocalyptic groups
Yoga organizations